Gilbert-Luc Devinaz (born 19 July 1953) is a French politician.

He is a member of the Socialist Party. He has been a member of the senate since 2018. He was General Councilor of the Rhône from 2011 to 2015. He was elected municipal councilor of Villeurbanne in 2017. He has served several terms as deputy mayor of Villeurbanne.
He also chairs the France-Armenia interparliamentary friendship group.

Biography
Gilbert-Luc Devinaz was born in Lyon, France, in 1953. He will be a member almost without interruption and will occupy various responsibilities there. He was research fellow at the center d'etudes techniques of Lyon. He became for the first time a municipal councilor for the town of Villeurbanne in 1983.

References 

1953 births
Living people
Senators of Rhône (department)
Politicians from Lyon
Socialist Party (France) politicians
20th-century French politicians
21st-century French politicians